Ayan Bhattacharjee (born 17 July 1991) is an Indian cricketer. He made his first-class debut for Bengal in the 2016–17 Ranji Trophy on 20 October 2016. He made his Twenty20 debut for Mizoram in the 2018–19 Syed Mushtaq Ali Trophy on 27 February 2019. He made his List A debut on 7 October 2019, for Bengal in the 2019–20 Vijay Hazare Trophy.

References

External links
 

1991 births
Living people
Indian cricketers
Bengal cricketers
Place of birth missing (living people)